Emanuel Pastreich (born in Nashville, Tennessee, 1964) is an American politician and international relations expert who serves as the president of the Asia Institute, a think tank with offices in Washington DC, Seoul, Tokyo and Hanoi. Pastreich declared his candidacy for president of the United States as an independent in February, 2020 and continues his campaign, giving numerous speeches calling for a transformational approach to security and economics. Originally a scholar of Asian studies, Pastreich writes on both East Asian classical literature and current issues in international relations and technology. He is also a columnist for The Korea Times and JoongAng Daily.

Biography
Pastreich attended Lowell High School in San Francisco, graduating in 1983. He began his studies at Yale University, from which he graduated with a B.A. in Chinese in 1987, and during college studied abroad at National Taiwan University. Pastreich obtained an M.A. in comparative literature at the University of Tokyo in 1991, where he wrote the master's dissertation, Edo kôki bunjin Tanomura Chikuden: Muyô no shiga" (The Late Edo Literatus Tanomura Chikuden; The Uselessness of Painting and Poetry), entirely in Japanese. He then returned to the United States and in 1998 received his Ph.D. in East Asian studies at Harvard University.  He served as assistant professor at the University of Illinois at Urbana–Champaign, George Washington University, and Solbridge International School of Business. Pastreich was an associate professor at the College of International Studies, Kyung Hee University.

Pastreich was born to symphony manager Peter Pastreich and painter Marie Louise Rouff. He has three siblings, Michael Pastreich, Anna Schlagel and Milena Pastreich.

Government public service
Pastreich previously served as an international relations adviser to the governor of Chungnam Province, as an external relations adviser at the Daedeok Innopolis research cluster,  and was appointed to serve on the committee for city administration (2010-2011) and was appointed to serve on the committee for city administration (2010-2011) and for foreign investment (2009-2010) for the city of Daejeon.

Work
Pastreich is president of The Asia Institute, a think tank that conducts research on the intersection of international relations, the environment and technology in East Asia. Previously, he was an associate professor at Kyung Hee University, advisor to the president of Kyung Hee University, advisor for international relations and foreign investment to the governor of Chungnam Province (2007-2008). Pastreich served in the United States as director of the KORUS House (2005-2007), a think tank for international relations housed in the Korean Embassy in Washington D.C., and as the editor-in-chief of Dynamic Korea, a journal of the Korean Foreign Ministry that introduces Korean culture and society, and as assistant professor at the University of Illinois, Urbana-Champaign.

His writings include the books The Novels of Park Jiwon: Translations of Overlooked Worlds, a collection of the novels of Korea's critical pre-modern author, The Visible Vernacular: Vernacular Chinese and the Emergence of a Literary Discourse on Popular Narrative in Edo Japan, a study of the reception of Chinese vernacular literature in Japan, and Earth Management: A Dialogue on Ancient Korean Wisdom and its Lessons for a New Earth. His Korean publications include Life is a Matter of Direction, not Speed: A Robinson Crusoe in Korea, a description of his experiences living in Korea, Scholars of the World Speak out About Korea's Future, a series of interviews with leading scholars such as Francis Fukuyama, Larry Wilkerson and Noam Chomsky about contemporary Korea, and Earth Management: Finding the Answer in the Hongik Tradition, a consideration of the importance of traditional culture in an age of ecological crisis. His Chinese publication is Searching for the Truth on Both Sides of the Ocean, in which he suggests a new paradigm for Sino-American relations and explores the value of traditional Chinese culture.

He declared his candidacy as an independent for president of the United States in February, 2020 in Washington D.C. and made his first formal speech in Seoul Korea about his campaign in June, 2020.

Personal life 

Emanuel Pastreich is a vegetarian for environmental reasons.

Bibliography

Books
 The Novels of Park Jiwon: Translations of Overlooked Worlds (2011). Seoul: Seoul National University Press. .
 The Visible Mundane: Vernacular Chinese and the Emergence of a Literary Discourse on Popular Narrative in Edo Japan (2011). Seoul: Seoul National University Press. .
  Insaeng eun sokdo ga anira banghyang ida: Habeodeu baksa eui hanguk pyoryugi (Life is a Matter of Direction, Not of Speed: Records of a Robinson Crusoe in Korea) (2011). London: Nomad Books. -03810. 
  Segye seokhak deul hanguk eui mirae reul mal hada (Scholars of the World Speak Out About Korea's Future) (2012). Seoul: Dasan Books. 
  Han'gukin man moreu neun dareun daehan min'guk (A Different Republic of Korea—About which only Koreans are Ignorant) (2013). Seoul: 21 Segi Books. 
 Selected Publications of The Asia Institute (2013). Seoul: The Asia Institute Press. ISBM 109788996984801.
 Earth Management: A Dialogue on Ancient Korean Wisdom and Its Lessons for a New Earth (2016); co-authored with Lee Ilchi. Seoul: Best Life Media. .
  Jigugyeongyoung Hongik e seo dap eul chatda (Earth Management: Finding the Answer in the Hongik tradition; co-authored with Lee Ilchi) (2016). Seoul: Hanmun Hwa. .
  Kuahai qiuzhen: Hafo boshi lun zhongmei weilai (Searching for the Truth on Both Sides of the Ocean) (2016). Hong Kong: Milky Way Publishers. .

See also

List of people from Nashville
List of Sinologists

References

External links
Circles and Squares bio
Emanuel Pastreich presidential campaign homepage

1964 births
Harvard University alumni
University of Tokyo alumni
Yale University alumni
Living people